Reviver or Revivor may refer to:

 Reviver, 1987 video game by Arsys Software
 Reviver, 2006 album by Pat the White
 Reviver, 2009 EP by Abe Vigoda
 Reviver, 2012 album by Callers
 Revivor, 2003 album by Funker Vogt
 "Reviver", 2010 song by 36 Crazyfists
 Reviver, 2022 album by Lane 8